Color magazine or colour magazine may refer to:

Generic terms 
A colour supplement, a full-colour magazine packaged with a newspaper
 Color magazine (lighting), a filter mechanism which is part of a lighting system

Individual magazines 
 Color (skateboard lifestyle magazine), a skateboard lifestyle culture quarterly published in Vancouver

See also 
 Colors (magazine)